Gerrhonotus parvus (common name: pygmy alligator lizard) is a species of lizard in the subfamily Gerrhonotinae. It is endemic to the state of Nuevo León, Mexico. The name parvus is from the Latin word for small because it is the species of smallest adult size recognized in the genus Gerrhonotus. They are usually found among dead leaves of yuccas in open wood areas. It seems to prefer dry limestone canyons. It is oviparous and has a litter size of 4–6 eggs. Its head is glossy and smooth, grayish brown in color with scattered dark spots. The lips are peppered with pigment and the chin and throat are white in color.

References

Gerrhonotus
Endemic reptiles of Mexico
Fauna of the Sierra Madre Oriental
Reptiles described in 1985